Arzu Jalilova (born 4 June 2004, Baku, Azerbaijan) is an Azerbanjani rhythmic gymnast.

References 

2004 births
Living people
Azerbaijani rhythmic gymnasts

Medalists at the Junior World Rhythmic Gymnastics Championships